Carlton House is a Grade II listed building in Plympton, Devon, England. Standing at 43 Fore Street, Plympton's main street, it dates to the early 19th century.

It has incised an stucco frontage with a plinth. A central panelled pilastered doorway has a moulded hood on consoles. The two-storey building has a double-depth floor plan with two rooms at the front flanking a central entrance hall, a similar layout to the nearby The Lodge at 103 Fore Street.

The building was evaluated by Time Team during their visit to Plympton in 1999. A wall belonging to an earlier incarnation of the adjacent Tan Cottage was discovered in the back garden of the property.

References

Grade II listed buildings in Devon
Buildings and structures in Plympton, Devon
19th-century establishments in England